Midlothian is a village in Bremen Township, Cook County, Illinois, United States. It is a southwestern suburb of Chicago. As of the 2020 census the population was 14,325.

History

Like many southwest suburbs of Chicago in the 1800s and early 1900s, the area now known as the Village of Midlothian consisted of a few area farmers being surrounded by large and small endeavors alike as the industrial age began its exponential expansion process in the Bremen Township in Cook County, Illinois community. By 1854, the sprawling landscape comprising the township of Bremen had a trail of railroad track carrying both passengers and commodities between Chicago and Joliet on the Chicago, Rock Island and Pacific Railroad. It had been a somewhat brutal battle for the Illinois Central Railroad over the decades, with Stephen A. Douglas and Abraham Lincoln working hard to establish the presence of the Illinois Central Railroad on a State level until Douglas moved to the federal level.  By 1850, Douglas was busy working on federally mandated development of transportation plans into law at a federal level for the benefit of the Illinois Central Railroad.

Explosions were not uncommon in gunpowder factories and storage facilities and 12 years later in 1906, an explosion leveled the DuPont facility.  Although there is currently no clear evidence as to the precise location of the facility, apparently the shock-waves from the explosion traveled a decent enough distance in which the windows of the Midlothian Country Club were shattered, according to a report on November 8, 1906, in the Charlotte News.  It also appears the Associated Press distributed the geographical location of the facility to be situated in Tinley Park, however a 1900 Homesteader's Map shows the DuPont property to be closer to what would become Oak Forest in 1947 rather than Tinley Park. Eventually the northern portion of the DuPont Farm and Ammunition Storage property was eventually annexed by the Village of Midlothian, while the rest of the DuPont property was acquired by Cook County, Illinois and developed into what is now the Midlothian Meadows Forest Preserve (part of the Cook County Forest Preserve system)

Despite land speculation and sporadic development growing from the direction of what would become the Village of Robbins in 1917, dirt roads continued to act as an uncontrollable barrier to a variety of economic activities, such as delivering goods and services.  While rain of any slight measure was a nuisance, it didn't take much to render the roadways virtually unusable by the wagons being pulled by horses. The extremely and extraordinarily wealthy members of the Midlothian Country Club found such a method of transportation enough of an inconvenience, a group of individuals decided to petition the State of Illinois for a charter to form the Midlothian - Blue Island Railroad and to lay tracks from Blue Island straight to the front lawn of the country club.

The initial charter approved a separate track to begin in Blue Island, Illinois and ending on the Midlothian Country Club grounds.  However, the Midlothian - Blue Island Railroad negotiated with the Chicago-Rock Island Railroad to build either the longest spur track or the Shortest Railroad in the World, as it became known as.  Rather than laying new rails all the way from Blue Island, they would use Rexford Crossing as a turn around point and then lay track a short distance away to the country club. As part of the arrangement, a station was erected in place of what constituted Rexford Crossing and the station was renamed to "Midlothian." Although it is unclear who exactly paid for the construction, ownership of the building was eventually acquired by the Chicago, Rock Island and Pacific while the stockholders of the Midlothian - Blue Island Railroad retained ownership of the rails and all of the rights and responsibilities associated with such ownership.  All rail cars and engines were purchased by the Midlothian - Blue Island Railroad and not the Chicago, Rock Island and Pacific. Although the club would not be annexed to Midlothian for a few decades, the Midlothian train station was located within the vicinity of the original boundaries for the village and eventually considered a part of the downtown area of Midlothian, which meant some of the tracks were to be governed by the municipal codes of the village.  Bremen Township and Cook County may have had property-related laws the company was supposed to adhere to, but even more telling is the absence of the company in a number of Railway and Warehouse Commission annual reports. By 1927, the Village of Midlothian was incorporated and at the end of the summer season in 1928, the Midlothian - Blue Island Railroad tracks were removed, thereby ending any potential track maintenance issues or conflicts with the village.

By the turn of the century, the Village of Midlothian was still primarily a farming and forested area, despite activities conducted by the Midlothian Country Club creating a short layover for passenger traffic to and from the Midlothian train station.  This stalling of development was partially driven by the housing speculation crash after the 1893 World's Columbian's Fair, especially the property that would eventually become the Village of Robbins in 1917. In addition, a large swath of the southwest suburbs of Chicago can quickly become quite soggy from a variety of sources.  Contemplating the odds of a flood or other natural disaster is a common contemplation when considering home ownership.  The rolling hills surrounding Midlothian and the creeks running through its fabric have always presented a natural path downward for water to travel without much width to the creeks to contain a heavy and steady rainfall. Therefore, until paved roads shifted from being a luxury to that of a necessity, families with names such as Woerheide, Largent, William Schwartz, Frank Coole, Benjamin Coole and William J. Shedd all had to contend with commerce-related issues all centering on roads that could be rendered virtually useless in a matter of minutes and potentially last for days. Even the construction of the train station has not seemed to attract significant passenger traffic over the decades, with little commerce being conducted in Midlothian other than farming, harvesting limestone and gunpowder manufacturing.  The first stationmaster was a woman and by 1912, R.K. Cummings was appointed first regular agent of the Chicago, Rock Island and Pacific Railroad.  In that same year, Cummings and two monthly ticket holders lived in the vicinity.

The Midlothian Fire Department was organized in 1924, possibly in preparation for the first attempt at incorporating the village.  However, for unknown reasons, the proposition was defeated and it wasn't until three years later in 1927 the residents would vote their approval of establishing the Village of Midlothian. The Village of Midlothian was formally incorporated March 17, 1927.  Although there are no clear records on why the name was chosen, there is common conclusion they adopted the name of the train station with perhaps hopes of garnering a sense of similar prestige for the village as was being generated by the golf club at the time, if not also marketing abilities. The following month, John H. Hamilton was elected as the village's first president and by the end of summer 1928, all of the rails belonging to the Midlothian - Blue Island Railroad were removed, leaving Midlothian with one train line. By 1929, Midlothian had its first newspaper, The Messenger owned by the Andrews brothers.  Kevin McCann was the first Editor In chief of the publication located above the old Largent store on 147th and Kildare, who later went on to serve as aide-de-camp to General Dwight Eisenhower during World War II as well as working with the General on his two books.

In the 1930s and '40s, homes continued to be built for people moving to and settling down in Midlothian. The Kreis Brothers opened the Ford Garage (where the village's fire engine was kept) and Chuck Cavallini began selling ice cream from his corner "Sweet Shop". In 1949, a Village Hall was constructed at the intersection of 148th and Pulaski, where village employees and officials still work out of as of 2014. As part of the architecture, divisions of the Village such as the police and fire departments are attached to the main building.  Across the parking lot along Waverly Avenue is the public works offices and garage while the VFW Hall is across from the entrance to the police department on Pulaski.

Geography
For genealogical purposes, historical government records frequently reference Midlothian property as Township 36 north, Range 13, East of 3rd Principal Meridian.
Midlothian is home to the Cook County Forest Preserve of Midlothian Meadows, and home to Belly Button Hill, a sledding hill at 150th & Kilbourn. It is also home to Natalie Creek and the Midlothian Creek.
Midlothian is part of the South Suburbs of Chicago and is in the Bremen Township.

Climate
Like most of Cook County, Midlothian can be expected to be very warm in the summer, but very cold in the winter.

Demographics
As of the 2020 census there were 14,325 people, 5,828 households, and 3,786 families residing in the village. The racial makeup of the village was 55.60% White, 13.49% African American, 1.15% Native American, 1.40% Asian, 0.03% Pacific Islander, 14.25% from other races, and 14.07% from two or more races. Hispanic or Latino of any race were 32.15% of the population.

There were 5,828 households, out of which 50.10% had children under the age of 18 living with them, 50.96% were married couples living together, 7.67% had a female householder with no husband present, and 35.04% were non-families. 32.45% of all households were made up of individuals, and 9.68% had someone living alone who was 65 years of age or older. The average household size was 3.11 and the average family size was 2.46.

The village's age distribution consisted of 22.3% under the age of 18, 7.6% from 18 to 24, 27% from 25 to 44, 28.1% from 45 to 64, and 15.1% who were 65 years of age or older. The median age was 39.7 years. For every 100 females, there were 105.4 males. For every 100 females age 18 and over, there were 103.7 males.

The median income for a household in the village was $61,067, and the median income for a family was $80,348. Males had a median income of $45,741 versus $34,098 for females. The per capita income for the village was $29,855. About 10.0% of families and 9.1% of the population were below the poverty line, including 7.2% of those under age 18 and 15.4% of those age 65 or over.

2020 census

Note: the US Census treats Hispanic/Latino as an ethnic category. This table excludes Latinos from the racial categories and assigns them to a separate category. Hispanics/Latinos can be of any race.

Arts and culture
Midlothian is known in the area for hosting the annual Fiesta at the St. Augustine Catholic Church at 147th & Keeler.

Parks and recreation
Kostner Park
Roesner Park
Bremen Heights Park
Waverly Park
Memorial Park
Scout Park

Government
The Government of Midlothian is run by the Village President, the Village Clerk, the Village Attorney, and 6 Village Trustees. Village Board Meetings are often held on the 2nd and 4th Wednesday of each month, and Committee Meetings are held on the 1st and 3rd Wednesday of each month at 7:00 PM.

List of village presidents

Infrastructure

Transportation
Midlothian is mainly known for the Midlothian station and being near the Tri-state Tollway (I-294) and I-57.

Notable people
 Gary Bettenhausen - auto racer
 John Coyne - novelist, was caddie master at Midlothian Country Club
 Jaclyn Dowaliby - murder victim
 Don A. Moore - Illinois judge, lawyer, and politician
 Johnny Mostil - outfielder for Chicago White Sox
 Ken Wahl (Anthony Calzaretta) - film and television actor, star of Wiseguy, Bremen High School graduate (1975)

See also 
 Shooting of Jemel Roberson by a Midlothian police officer

References

External links
 Village of Midlothian official website

Villages in Illinois
Villages in Cook County, Illinois
Chicago metropolitan area
Populated places established in 1927
1927 establishments in Illinois